William Perry Fogg (27 July 1826 – 8 May 1909) was an American adventurer and author, as well as the inspiration for Phileas Fogg in the 1873 novel Around the World in 80 Days.

Fogg was born in Exeter, New Hampshire, the son of Josiah Fogg and Hannah née Pecker. As a child, his family moved to Cleveland where he became an early member and President of the New England Society which had been founded to encourage unity among the descendants of New England pioneers. In 1852 he married Mary Ann Gould with whom he had two daughters: Annie and Helen. In Cleveland, Fogg set himself up as a seller of chinaware and became interested in the day-to-day running of the city, eventually being appointed to the Board of Commissioners in 1866. Along with Herman M. Chapin, the mayor of Cleveland, Fogg and the other commissioners wrote the Metropolitan Police Act of 1866. In 1868 Fogg began what he became most famous for, his travels around the world during which he became one of the first Americans to travel through the interior of Japan.
 
From 1870 The Cleveland Leader publicised his travels by publishing the letters he wrote home, which were later privately published in 1872 as Round the World: Letters from Japan, China, India and Egypt in which he described traveling by train from Cleveland to San Francisco via Salt Lake City where he had an interview with Brigham Young following which he boarded a Pacific Mail Steamer from San Francisco to Japan and then visited China (including Hong Kong), Singapore, Malacca and Penang. He then moved on to India before traveling from Bombay to Suez where he took the Suez Canal to Cairo where he saw the Pyramids.

His second book Arabistan, or The Land of the Arabian Nights (England, 1872), covered his travels through Egypt, Arabia and Persia to Baghdad. His last book was the revised American edition of Land of the Arabian Nights. On his return to the United States, Fogg and the lawyer Richard C. Parsons bought the Herald Publishing Co. in Cleveland in 1877. When this failed Parsons was forced to return to his legal practice while Fogg resumed his international travels. On his final return to the United States Fogg lived in Roselle, New Jersey from 1901–08 and then in Morris Plains for the last year of his life.

References

External links
Fogg's Passport Application (1873) - NARA M1372. Images of handwritten letters and application forms for U.S. passports, 1795-1905
Complete copy of "Round the world." Letters from Japan, China, India, and Egypt. by Fogg, Wm. Perry (William Perry), b. 1826. Publication date: 1872. Hosted on the Internet Archive.

1826 births
1909 deaths
People from Exeter, New Hampshire
Writers from Cleveland
People from Roselle, New Jersey
People from Morris Plains, New Jersey
American explorers
American male non-fiction writers
19th-century American non-fiction writers
Jules Verne